Henry Coutts Simpson (10 October 1888 – 1951) was a Scottish professional football inside right who played in the Scottish League for Ayr United, St Bernard's, East Stirlingshire and Raith Rovers. He also played in the Football League for Leicester Fosse.

Personal life 
Simpson served in the First World War and was wounded at Gallipoli in August 1915.

Career statistics

References 

Scottish footballers
Scottish Football League players
Place of death missing
British Army personnel of World War I
Ayr United F.C. players
1888 births
1951 deaths
People from Peterhead
Association football inside forwards
Peterhead F.C. players
St Bernard's F.C. players
Leicester City F.C. players
Raith Rovers F.C. players
East Stirlingshire F.C. players
Footballers from Aberdeenshire